Newton Jones Burkett, III (born May 6, 1962), known as N.J. Burkett, is a correspondent for WABC-TV, the largest ABC television station in the United States. He joined the Eyewitness News team in July 1989 from WFSB-TV in Hartford, Connecticut, where he had been a correspondent since 1986.

Early life and education
Burkett grew up in Elizabeth, New Jersey, though he describes the choice to use the initials "N.J." as arising from the efforts of his agent and a station president to make him seem less "aristocratic" and not a tribute to his home state. He graduated from Elizabeth High School with the class of 1980 and attended Columbia University.

Career
Burkett is best known for his coverage of the World Trade Center attacks of September 11, 2001 (he was located across from the plaza and just survived the collapse of South Tower), for which he shared or was awarded outright many prestigious honors, including the George Foster Peabody Award, the Alfred I. duPont-Columbia University Award, the Edward R. Murrow Award, and the Emmy Award for Outstanding On-Camera Achievement from the New York Chapter of the National Academy of Television Arts and Sciences. He holds a BA in political science and a master's in international affairs, both from Columbia University.

In June 2016, Burkett was elected First Vice Chairman of the National Academy of Television Arts and Sciences by the Academy's Board of Trustees, and served in that capacity until June 2018. He served on the Academy's Executive Committee from 2014 to 2018 and for two terms as President of the Academy's flagship chapter in New York from 2011 to 2015.

In May 2019, he was elected New York Chapter President for a third time by the chapter's Board of Governors.  

In September 2019, Burkett was elected to the Board of Trustees of Newark Public Radio, the operator of WBGO-FM a not-for-profit jazz radio station in Newark, N.J.

References

External links

1962 births
American reporters and correspondents
Elizabeth High School (New Jersey) alumni
People from Elizabeth, New Jersey
People from Orange, New Jersey
Living people
School of International and Public Affairs, Columbia University alumni
Survivors of the September 11 attacks